2020 2. deild was the 45th season of the third-tier football on the Faroe Islands.

League table

Results
Each team plays two times (once at home and once away) against every other team for a total of 18 matches each.

Rounds 1–18

See also
2020 Faroe Islands Premier League
2020 Faroe Islands Cup
2020 1. deild

References

2. deild
3
Faroe
Faroe